Lightning Swords of Death is an American black metal band formed in 2003 by vocalist Autarch and guitarist Roskva in Los Angeles, California.

Lightning Swords of Death signed a record deal with Metal Blade Records in 2009 and continued to push their music through their DIY attitude, getting multiple tracks on the PSP game Undead Knights as well as a track featured on the soundtrack for the 2009 film The Stepfather.

Discography

Studio albums
The Golden Plague (2007)
The Extra Dimensional Wound (2010) Metal Blade Records
Baphometic Chaosium (2013)

Demos
Plunder & Lightning (2005)

Splits
Lightning Swords of Death/Valdur (2008)

Band members

Current members
Autarch (Farron Loathing) - Vocals
Roskva (Jeremy Stramaglio) - Guitar
Menno - Bass
Inverted Chris (Chris Velez) - Guitar
Jackson Ferris - Drums

Former members
Mike Vega - Drums
Jason Brown - Bass
Jonathan Cathey - Drums
Thrudvang - Drums

References

External links

Lightning Swords of Death on Myspace

Black metal musical groups from California
Musical groups established in 2003
Musical groups from Los Angeles
Metal Blade Records artists